Matheus de Jesus Cardoso (born 22 February 1996), commonly known as Matheus Banguelê, is a Brazilian footballer who plays as a midfielder for Louletano.

Club career
Banguelê joined Grêmio Novorizontino on loan ahead of the 2017 Campeonato Paulista.

Career statistics

Club

Notes

References

1996 births
Living people
Brazilian footballers
Brazilian expatriate footballers
Association football midfielders
São Paulo FC players
Grêmio Novorizontino players
Sport Club Internacional players
Louletano D.C. players
Brazilian expatriate sportspeople in Portugal
Expatriate footballers in Portugal